This article contains information about the literary events and publications of 1543.

Events
unknown date – In France:
The Faculty of Theology of the University of Paris issues its first Index of prohibited (religious) books.
Guillaume Rouillé sets up as a bookseller in Lyon.

New books

Prose
Mikael Agricola – Abckiria (first book printed in Finnish)
Nicolaus Copernicus – De revolutionibus orbium coelestium (On the Revolution of the Heavenly Spheres)
Martin Luther – Vom Schem Hamphoras
Fernan Perez de Oliva, completed by Francisco Cervantes de Salazar – Dialogo de la dignidad del hombre
Andreas Vesalius – De humani corporis fabrica libri septem (On the Fabric of the Human Body, in Seven Books)
Benefizio della Morte di Cristo ("The Benefit of Christ's Death", attributed to Aonio Paleario)

Drama
Lodovico Dolce – Hecuba

Poetry
See 1543 in poetry

Births
February 4 – Giovanni Francesco Fara, Sardinian historian, geographer and clergyman
February 25 – Sharaf Khan Bidlisi, politician, historian and poet (died 1603)
November 2 – Kasper Franck, German theologian (died 1584)
Unknown dates 
Louis Bellaud, Occitan language writer and poet (died 1588)
Thomas Deloney, silk weaver and writer (died in or before 1600 in literature)
Bartosz Paprocki, Polish and Czech historiographer, translator and poet (died 1614)
Thomas Twyne, Elizabethan translator and physician (died 1613)
Antonio Veneziano, Sicilian poet (died 1593)

Deaths
May 24 – Nicolaus Copernicus, Polish Renaissance mathematician and astronomer (born 1473)
July 19 – Berthold of Chiemsee, German theologian (born 1465)
Unknown date – Jan Dubčanský ze Zdenína, Moravian nobleman, printer of Moravia's first Czech-language book (born 1490)

References

Years of the 16th century in literature